Francis Joseph "Shag" Shaughnessy (April 8, 1883 – May 15, 1969) was an American athlete and sports executive. Shaughnessy played both baseball and football and was an executive in baseball, football and ice hockey. He was born in the United States and moved to Canada in the 1910s, where he was involved with football and ice hockey teams in Montreal and Ottawa. He was later president of the International League of baseball. His son Frank Shaughnessy Jr. also played football and ice hockey, and played ice hockey for the United States in the 1936 Winter Olympics.

College
Shaughnessy played football and baseball at the University of Notre Dame from 1901 to 1904, serving as football captain his senior year.

Baseball
Shaughnessy had brief Major League baseball appearances with the Washington Senators in 1905 and the Philadelphia Athletics in 1908.

Shaughnessy was a minor league manager for 19 years between 1909–1936, compiling a 1148–1012 record.  He was General Manager of the Montreal Royals from 1932–1934, and a coach for the Detroit Tigers in 1928.  He served as President of the International League from 1936–1960, and invented a playoff system known as the Shaughnessy playoffs. In, 1947, he was inducted in the International League Hall of Fame, and in 1953 he was presented with the King of Baseball award given by Minor League Baseball.

Football
He introduced the option play to American football while coaching at Yale University and Cornell University.  He also was football and baseball coach at Clemson University, and football coach at Washington and Lee University.

Shaughnessy was the first professional coach hired in Canadian university football and his full-time appointment at Montreal's McGill University in 1912 was not well received by the other teams in the league.

In each of his first two years, McGill won the Yates Cup football championship. He coached McGill to a 34-34-2 regular season record in 17 seasons. The 34 victories stood until 1979 as the most by a McGill football coach.

Shaughnessy played baseball during the summer in Ottawa, where he met his wife. He became involved in Ottawa sports, and was coach of the Ottawa Rough Riders for the 1915 season.

A football innovator, Shaughnessy introduced the forward pass to Canadian university football when McGill played Syracuse University in an experimental game held on November 5, 1921 at Percival Molson Memorial Stadium in Montreal.  In spite of this, the forward pass was not officially allowed in Canadian football rules until 1929.  He was the first football coach in Canada to introduce "X" and "Y" strategic formations and "secondary defence".

In 1969, the Shaughnessy Cup was first presented for local football supremacy between McGill and Loyola College. Since 1975, the Cup has been fought for in an annual challenge match between McGill and Concordia University.

Shaughnessy was inducted as a builder into the Canadian Football Hall of Fame in 1963, the Canadian Baseball Hall of Fame in 1983, its inaugural induction year, and the McGill University Sports Hall of Fame in 1997.

Ice hockey
While living in Ottawa, Shaughnessy served from 1914 until 1916 as the manager of the Ottawa Senators.

Shaughnessy coached the McGill women's hockey team and was appointed men's hockey coach in 1919, guiding the Redmen to a 61-56-2 record until stepping down in 1927. The 61 victories established a McGill record and since then, has only been surpassed by four other McGill hockey coaches.

References

External links
 
 

1880s births
1969 deaths
People from Amboy, Illinois
Baseball players from Illinois
Players of American football from Illinois
Ice hockey people from Illinois
Baseball players from Montreal
Bradford Drillers players
Canadian Baseball Hall of Fame inductees
Canadian Football Hall of Fame inductees
Clemson Tigers baseball coaches
Clemson Tigers football coaches
Cornell Big Red football coaches
Detroit Tigers coaches
Fort Wayne Railroaders players
McGill Redbirds football coaches
Academic staff of McGill University
Minor league baseball executives
Montgomery Senators players
Montreal Royals managers
Notre Dame Fighting Irish baseball players
Notre Dame Fighting Irish football players
Ottawa Rough Riders coaches
Philadelphia Athletics players
Reading Pretzels players
Roanoke Tigers players
San Francisco Seals (baseball) players
Sioux City Soos players
South Bend Greens players
Syracuse Stars (minor league baseball) players
Washington and Lee Generals football coaches
Washington Senators (1901–1960) players
Wellsville Rainmakers players
Yale Bulldogs football coaches
Baseball coaches from Illinois
Freeport Pretzels players
Shamokin (minor league baseball) players
Warren Warriors players